The 5th G7 Summit was held at Tokyo, Japan between June 28 and 29, 1979. The venue for the summit meetings was the State Guesthouse.
 
The Group of Seven (G7) was an unofficial forum which brought together the heads of the richest industrialized countries: France, West Germany, Italy, Japan, the United Kingdom, the United States, Canada (since 1976), and the President of the European Commission (starting officially in 1981). The summits were not meant to be linked formally with wider international institutions; and in fact, a mild rebellion against the stiff formality of other international meetings was a part of the genesis of cooperation between France's president Valéry Giscard d'Estaing and West Germany's chancellor Helmut Schmidt as they conceived the first Group of Six (G6) summit in 1975.

Leaders at the summit
The G7 is an unofficial annual forum for the leaders of Canada, the European Commission, France, Germany, Italy, Japan, the United Kingdom and the United States.

The 5th G7 summit was the first summit for British Prime Minister Margaret Thatcher. It was also the first and only summit for Canadian Prime Minister Joe Clark and Japanese Prime Minister Masayoshi Ohira.

Participants
These summit participants are the current "core members" of the international forum:

Issues
The summit was intended as a venue for resolving differences among its members. As a practical matter, the summit was also conceived as an opportunity for its members to give each other mutual encouragement in the face of difficult economic decisions. Coming amidst the "second oil shock" caused by the Iranian Revolution, the summit became devoted to the problem of energy, according to historian Daniel Yergin. "It was also a very nasty one. Tempers were badly frayed." US President Jimmy Carter stated that West German Chancellor Helmut Schmidt "got personally abusive toward me .... He alleged that American interference in the Middle East trying to work for a peace treaty was what had cause the problems with oil all over the world."

Gallery

See also
 G8

Notes

References
 Bayne, Nicholas and Robert D. Putnam. (2000).  Hanging in There: The G7 and G8 Summit in Maturity and Renewal. Aldershot, Hampshire, England: Ashgate Publishing. ; OCLC 43186692
 Reinalda, Bob and Bertjan Verbeek. (1998).  Autonomous Policy Making by International Organizations. London: Routledge.  ; ;   OCLC 39013643

External links
 No official website is created for any G7 summit prior to 1995 -- see the 21st G7 summit.
 University of Toronto: G8 Research Group, G8 Information Centre
 G7 1979, delegations & documents

G7 summit
G7 summit
1979 in international relations
G7 summit
1979 in Tokyo
G7 summit 1979
G7 summit 1979
1979
History of Tokyo
June 1979 events in Asia